In the 2016 season, Galway started their campaign winning their 6th FBD Insurance League title with a win over Roscommon. Galway ended Mayo's bid for a 6th consecutive Connacht Senior Football Championship title with an unlikely 3 point victory in McHale Park. In the All-Ireland quarter-final Galway were defeated by Tipperary.

Kits

Competitions

FBD League

Fixtures

Table

National Football League Division 2

Fixtures

Table

Connacht Senior Football Championship

Fixtures

Bracket

2016 All-Ireland Senior Football Championship

Fixtures

References

Galway football season
Galway county football team seasons